Thatcher is a town in Graham County, Arizona, United States. According to the 2010 Census, the population of the town is 4,865. It is part of the Safford Micropolitan Statistical Area.

Thatcher is the home of Eastern Arizona College (EAC), a college that offers two year degrees and includes a nursing school.

Geography
Thatcher is located at  (32.832685, −109.762879).

The town is centered in the Upper Gila River Valley with one of Arizona's famous Madrean Sky Islands towering to the south and the Gila River to the north.

Demographics

As of the census of 2000, there were 4,022 people, 1,281 households, and 927 families residing in the town. The racial makeup of the town was 84.7% White, 0.8% Black or African American, 1.8% Native American, 0.5% Asian, 0.1% Pacific Islander, 9.9% from other races, and 2.2% from two or more races. 19.5% of the population were Hispanic or Latino of any race.

There were 1,281 households, out of which 36.3% had children under the age of 18 living with them, 59.3% were married couples living together, 9.9% had a female householder with no husband present, and 27.6% were non-families. 19.7% of all households were made up of individuals, and 10.5% had someone living alone who was 65 years of age or older. The average household size was 2.94 and the average family size was 3.37.

In the town, the population was spread out, with 27.6% under the age of 18, 22.8% from 18 to 24, 18.9% from 25 to 44, 18.3% from 45 to 64, and 12.4% who were 65 years of age or older. The median age was 25 years. For every 100 females, there were 87.9 males. For every 100 females age 18 and over, there were 83.5 males.

The median income for a household in the town was $32,412, and the median income for a family was $40,392. Males had a median income of $35,815 versus $20,964 for females. The per capita income for the town was $12,961. 17.2% of the population lives below the poverty line.

Emergency response
Emergency 911 services are provided by the 24/7 dispatch center of the Graham County Sheriff's Office. Fire services are provided by the all volunteer Thatcher Fire Department, which has the capability to respond with various types of equipment, including several fire engines and a ladder truck. Mount Graham Regional Medical Center is the medical services provider for the area.

The Thatcher Police Department (TPD) is the municipal law enforcement agency responsible for policing the town. It has an approximately 10-man uniformed division.

History
Thatcher was originally settled by members of the Church of Jesus Christ of Latter-day Saints.  The first settler was John M. Moody who arrived in Thatcher with his wife and children in 1881. The founding of Thatcher is attributed to Mormon pioneer Christopher Layton, who bought two thousand acres, named the acreage "Thatcher", divided them into lots, and sold those lots to Mormon settlers. Layton also bought a gristmill and built roads, canals and homes.

Eastern Arizona College traces its history to the St. Joseph Stake Academy started by the church in nearby Central. Central is also the location of the Gila Valley Arizona Temple.

Transportation
San Carlos Apache Nnee Bich'o Nii Transit provides transportation from Thatcher to the San Carlos Apache Indian Reservation, Safford and Globe. Greyhound Lines serves Thatcher on its Phoenix–El Paso via Globe route.

The Arizona Eastern Railway operates rail freight through town on a branch formerly operated by the Southern Pacific.  Traffic is primarily copper products on the route between Bowie and Miami, AZ.

Notable people
 Frank Wanlass, inventor of CMOS and pioneer in the field of solid-state electronics.
 Spencer W. Kimball, former president of the Church of Jesus Christ of Latter-day Saints.
 Don Lancaster, early print on demand and personal computer pioneer, involved in the keyboard design of the Apple I computer.
 Jess Mortensen, former coach and NCAA-champion track athlete from USC and former world record holder in decathlon.
 Elliot Johnson, professional baseball player MLB
 Jeremy Nelson, award-winning visual effects artist.
 Jacque Mercer, Miss Arizona and Miss America, 1949.

Historic Brinkeroff Hotel and Spencer W. Kimball Childhood Home

See also
 The Church of Jesus Christ of Latter-day Saints in Arizona

References

External links
 Town website
 Official page
 Road-Police – Thatcher, Arizona
 County website

Populated places established in 1881
Towns in Graham County, Arizona
Safford, Arizona micropolitan area
1881 establishments in Arizona Territory